Firebase Birmingham (also known as FSB Birmingham, LZ Birmingham and Huế Southwest Airfield) is a former U.S. Army and Army of the Republic of Vietnam (ARVN) firebase southwest of Huế in Thừa Thiên–Huế Province, Vietnam.

History

1968
The base was originally established in March/April 1968 by the 2nd Brigade, 101st Airborne Division on Highway 547 as part of Operation Jeb Stuart. The base is located approximately 12 km southwest of Huế.

1969-70
Birmingham was used to support the 101st Airborne's major operations against the People's Army of Vietnam (PAVN) base areas in the A Sầu Valley - Operation Apache Snow in 1969 and Operation Texas Star in 1970.

1972
On 1 February 1972 in a turnover ceremony attended by Brigadier General John G. Hill Jr., assistant Division commander, 101st Airborne Division and Major General Phạm Văn Phú, commanding general of the Army of the Republic of Vietnam (ARVN) 1st Division, Birmingham was handed over to the ARVN.

Like most other support bases in Thừa Thiên Province, the base came under intense fire during the Easter Offensive of 1972. Following a PAVN attack on Firebase Bastogne, 6km to the west, on 9 April the ARVN 54th Regiment's headquarters were moved to the base from Bastogne.

On 14 May approximately 4,000 ARVN 1st Division troops supported by artillery and B-52 strikes advanced west along Route 547 coming to within  of Firebase Bastogne and killed 110 PAVN.

The base was overrun by the PAVN, but later recaptured by the ARVN.

1975
The base was captured by the PAVN again during the 1975 Spring Offensive.

Current use
The base is abandoned and turned over to farmland and housing.

References

Installations of the United States Army in South Vietnam
Installations of the Army of the Republic of Vietnam
Buildings and structures in Thừa Thiên Huế province